Nebesa (German: Himmelreich, formerly Egrisch Reuth) is a small village in Karlovy Vary Region, Czech Republic. It is one of the nine town districts of Aš. In 2001 the village had a population of 13.

In the village there is a chapel of Virgin Mary, a restaurant and bus stop.

Geography 
Nebesa lies 3 kilometres southeast from Aš, on extensive area, but mostly covered by forests.

History 
Nebesa is first mentioned in 1315. During the Seven Years' War  an entrenchment was built here by Austrian marshal Macquir. On May 8, 1759 a battle was fought here between armies of Austrian marshal Macquir and Prussian general von Finck.

Etymology 
In Czech, Nebesa means heaven. The German name, Himmelreich, has a similar meaning: himmel means heaven and reich means empire.

Landmarks 
 Catholic chapel of Virgin Mary from 1907
 iron crucifix from 1862.

References 

Aš
Villages in Cheb District